Scotty Holt is an American jazz bassist. He is known for his work with Jackie McLean for Blue Note Records in the 1960s, on albums such as New and Old Gospel and Hipnosis. He also performed in McLean's quartet, along with Billy Higgins and LaMont Johnson. An example of their work in concert is provided by the SteepleChase Records LP, Dr. Jackle. He also recorded with Woody Shaw, Bud Powell, and Ornette Coleman. He toured Europe with Art Blakey in 1969, and has not recorded since.

References

American jazz double-bassists
Male double-bassists
Year of birth missing (living people)
SteepleChase Records artists
Living people
21st-century double-bassists
21st-century American male musicians
American male jazz musicians